Balaghat Assembly constituency is one of the 230 Vidhan Sabha (Legislative Assembly) constituencies of Madhya Pradesh state in central India.

It is part of Balaghat District.

Members of Legislative Assembly

See also
 Balaghat

References

Assembly constituencies of Madhya Pradesh
Balaghat district